John Quincy Adams (October 5, 1816March 17, 1895) was an American educator and Republican politician. He served as a member of the Wisconsin State Senate and the Assembly, representing Columbia County.

Biography
Adams was born in Ashfield, Massachusetts, the son of Charles Adams and Polly ( Howes). He was educated in the common schools and became a teacher. He moved to Fountain Prairie, Wisconsin, in 1844, and served on the Columbia County and Fountain Prairie town boards as the Columbia County treasurer and the Fountain Prairie town superintendent of schools. Adams also served on the Columbus school board and other offices.

He served as a Republican member of the Wisconsin State Assembly in 1853 and 1863, and was a member of the Wisconsin State Senate from 1854 to 1856. He represented Columbia County, Wisconsin.

Adams died on March 17, 1895, in Columbus.

Personal life
Adams married Lucy S. Pomeroy on June 11, 1846, and they had ten children. He and his family were Congregationalists.

References

External links
 

1816 births
1895 deaths
Republican Party members of the Wisconsin State Assembly
People from Ashfield, Massachusetts
People from Fountain Prairie, Wisconsin
County officials in Wisconsin
County supervisors in Wisconsin
Republican Party Wisconsin state senators
19th-century American politicians